Ruck.us is a political website builder designed for American candidates and organizations seeking state and local-level political office. It is designed for ease of use.

History
Ruck.us was founded by Nathan Daschle, former Executive Director of the Democratic Governors Association and son of former Senator Tom Daschle, and Raymond Glendening, former Democratic Governors Association Political Director and son of former Maryland Governor Parris Glendening, in 2011.It began as a second generation social network for politics  to break up the two-party system.

In late 2013, Daschle “realized that while technology has revolutionized the more well-funded campaigns, basic tools were still out of reach for the over 1 million candidates at the state and local level” and pivoted into the campaign technology business. He was joined by Jonathan Zucker, the founder of the political fundraising company Democracy Engine and former Executive Director of ActBlue, as Co-Founder, CTO and Head of Product, and angel investor. Consultant Leo Wang joined as Co-Founder and Chief Strategy Officer.

Ruck.us' Board of Advisors includes presidential strategist Mark McKinnon, former Bloomberg for Mayor campaign manager Bradley Tusk, well-known pundit and strategist Joe Trippi, former Mayor of Washington, D.C. Adrian Fenty, and several others.

Feature Set

Ruck.us aims to offer the tools to create a “professional and highly functional campaign website". 

Its feature set includes:
 Online donation processing through Democracy Engine
 Facebook and Twitter integration
 Photo and video hosting
 Space for a candidate or organization biography
 "Issues statement" panels for staking positions on specific topics
 Event management
 Space for press clips

In February 2015, Ruck.us unveiled “Ruck.us Premium,” an expanded feature set that offers users more tools, like custom domain names and multiple-administrator support, for a monthly fee.

Recognition

In recognition of the platform’s potential, Nathan Daschle was named one of Campaigns & Elections Magazine’s Top 50 Political Influencers for 2014 for his work on Ruck.us and his commitment to “better meet the digital demands of campaigns lower down the ballot.”

Status

In the 2014 election cycle, Ruck.us partnered with the Democratic Parties of Michigan, Maryland and Idaho, bringing hundreds of candidates and organizations online in those states and securing an additional $500,000 in funding and investment. It has since formed partnerships with the Democratic Parties of Georgia, Louisiana, and the Association of State Democratic Chairs.

References

External links
 Ruck.us

2011 establishments in the United States
Internet properties established in 2011
American political websites